The Much Wenlock Guildhall is a guildhall located on Wilmore Street in Much Wenlock, Shropshire. It is a Grade II* listed building.

History

In the aftermath of the dissolution of the monasteries, which saw the powers of Wenlock Priory suppressed, civic leaders sought a new meeting place to conduct the business of the town. The new half-timbered building which they commissioned was completed in two phases, the south end (the court room) in 1540 and the north end (the council chamber) in 1557.

The design for the main frontage on Wilmore Street featured three large gables. On the ground floor, at the north end there was initially a prison (it was dismantled in 1869), in the central section there was arcading to allow markets to he held and at the southern end there was a passageway for carriages to pass through. At first floor level, the design involved tall mullion windows below each of the three gables. A new cupola was erected on the roof in 1720.

Internally, the principal rooms are the courtroom and the council chamber, both on the first floor. The courtroom was the venue for the Quarter sessions where the more serious offences were considered, and also the venue for the Petty sessions where more trivial offences were considered. The Royal Coat of Arms, which is that of Queen Elizabeth I, was erected in the courtroom in 1589. An "inner room" for the storage of court records was created in 1616. The last quarter sessions were held in the courtroom in 1951 and the last petty sessions, by then known as magistrates' courts, were held there in 1985.

The council chamber was the meeting place of the municipal borough of Much Wenlock which was incorporated under the Municipal Corporations Act 1835; it was fitted out with ornate Jacobean style panelling which had been retrieved from a local country house and installed at the expense of the educationalist, William Penny Brookes in 1848. The council chamber ceased to be the local seat of government when Much Wenlock was absorbed into the Bridgnorth Rural District in 1966. However, it still remains the meeting place of the local town council.

The principal rooms are open to visitors (after the payment of a fee) from April to October. The stocks and the whipping post can both be seen on the ground floor.

Notes

See also
 Listed buildings in Much Wenlock
 Guild
 Guildhall

References

Guildhalls in the United Kingdom
Guildhall
City and town halls in Shropshire
Government buildings completed in 1557